North Florida Christian School (NFCS) is a private Christian school in Tallahassee, Florida, originally founded as a segregation academy. The school is administered by North Florida Baptist Church, formerly known as Temple Baptist Church.

History
Originally known as Tallahassee Christian School, it was founded in 1966 by Temple Baptist Church pastor Rayburn L. Blair and headmaster James Pound. Pound served as principal and school superintendent until his retirement in 1988.

Although the school is open today to students of all races, it was founded by white parents, one of several segregation academies started in response to the federally mandated racial integration of Leon County Schools.

Among the parents who withdrew their children from public schools and enrolled them at NFCS were Board of Regents member Fred Parker and state senator Miley Miers. Parker told the AP that he enrolled his four children in NFCS because he didn't want them to be subject to desegregation busing. Parker added that an advantage of NFCS was that the private school's bus service had a stop near his home. Miers said he moved her three children to NFCS since so they would not "suffer" from the end of the separate-but-equal doctrine.

In 1970, NFCS signed an agreement to lease the Old Sealey School campus from the Leon County school board for $5.00 per day. In response to the lease, the U.S. Department of Health, Education, and Welfare blocked the public school system from receiving a $200,000 federal grant since the school board was aiding a racially segregated private school.

NFCS hosted a campaign rally for George Wallace's 1972 presidential campaign. Wallace later claimed he had no prior knowledge of flyers distributed at the rally promoting school segregation.

In 1975, school head James Pound told the Tallahassee Democrat that the school had turned down all black applicants to avoid racial conflict at the school.

In 1978, NFCS expelled three students because their parents tried to start a parent teacher organization independent of the school. About 100 parents attempted to form the PTA to improve academic standards at the NFCS. The school, which at the time had over 1700 students, sent a letter to all parents explaining that if they disagreed with the church's administration of the school, they should withdraw their children.

School faculty of Tallahassee Christian helped establish another segregation academy, Gadsden Christian Academy (now known as the Tallavanna Christian School) in Gadsden County in 1971.

Demographics
In 2018 the school reported to the NCES the following: 506 total students, of whom 261 were White, 147 Black, 23 Hispanic, 7 Asian and 12 of two or more races.

Accreditation
NFCS is accredited by the Southern Association of Colleges and Schools, the Florida Association of Christian Colleges and Schools, and the Commission on International and Trans-Regional Accreditation.

Athletics

1986 FHSAA player eligibility controversy
In 1986, the football team included a student who transferred in violation of FHSAA regulations. The FHSAA declared each game in which the student participated be forfeited, making the school ineligible for the playoffs. NFCS sued in state court and was granted an injunction allowing it to participate in the playoffs. The court later upheld the ruling allowing the student's participation.

State championships

Notable people
Maria Boren - The Apprentice Season 2
Shannon Bream - Miss Virginia 1990, Fox News host
Kristen Ledlow - American sports anchor. Host of NBA TV's NBA Inside Stuff.
Ernie Sims - NFL football player
Casey Weldon - Football player
Denise Williams - Convicted of Conspiracy to Commit Murder (Jerry Williams)
Jerry Michael Williams, murder victim
John Nogowski - MLB Baseball Player

References

External links
NFC web site

1966 establishments in Florida
Educational institutions established in 1966
Christian schools in Florida
Schools in Tallahassee, Florida
High schools in Leon County, Florida
Private K-12 schools in Florida
Segregation academies in Florida